is a 1988 Japanese drama film directed by Yoshishige Yoshida, based on the 1847 novel by Emily Brontë. It was entered into the 1988 Cannes Film Festival.

Plot
The film retells the events of Emily Bronte's tale of vengeance and obsessive love, set in medieval Japan. Each character acts as the original novel's equivalent. For example, the protagonists of Bronte's novel, Heathcliff and Catherine, are Onimaru and Kinu in this film

Cast
 Yūsaku Matsuda as Onimaru
 Yūko Tanaka as Kinu Yamabe
 Rentarō Mikuni as Takamaru
 Tatsuo Nadaka as Mitsuhiko
 Eri Ishida as Tae
 Nagare Hagiwara as Hidemaru
 Keiko Ito as Shino
 Masato Furuoya as Yoshimaru
 Tomoko Takabe as Kinu, daughter
 Masao Imafuku as Ichi
 Shin Ueda as Suka
 Taro Shigaki

References

External links
 

1988 films
1988 drama films
Japanese drama films
1980s Japanese-language films
Films directed by Yoshishige Yoshida
Films based on Wuthering Heights
1980s Japanese films